= In, Ardabil =

In
- Location in Iran
- Coordinates: 38°49′43″N 48°01′37″E
- Country: Iran
- Province: Ardabil Province
- Time zone: UTC+3:30 (IRST)
  - Summer (DST): UTC+4:30 (IRDT)

In (Persian: به) is a village in the Ardabil Province of Iran.
